Soundsystem is the fifth studio album by 311, released on October 12, 1999. Soundsystem, which was certified Gold by the RIAA, was the last 311 album on Capricorn Records before the band switched to Volcano Records in 2000. Recording processes for the album began on March 11, 1999.

Reception

Rolling Stone discusses their mix of various genres, commenting "they offer their most ambitious fusion yet -- each track is a whirlwind tour of their soulful influences. Alas, the ingredients usually refuse to mix in 311's hands, resulting in disjunctions that veer between the bland and the unintentionally funny".

Track listing

Personnel
Credits adapted from album’s liner notes.

311
Nick Hexum – vocals, rhythm guitar, programming
Chad Sexton – drums, percussion, programming
Doug "S.A." Martinez – vocals, DJ
Tim Mahoney – lead guitar
Aaron "P-Nut" Wills – bass

Production
Scotch Ralston – producer, engineer, mixing
Hugh Padgham – producer, engineer
Alex Rivera – assistant engineer
Cameron Webb – assistant mix engineer
Joe Gastwirt – mastering

Charts

Album

Singles

References

1999 albums
311 (band) albums
Albums produced by Hugh Padgham
Capricorn Records albums